India is a country in South Asia.

India may also refer to:

Places
India, a village in Butor Commune, Transnistria
India, Texas, an unincorporated community in the United States

Historical
Indian subcontinent, inclusive of India's neighbouring countries

India (Herodotus), the location of the historic India according to Herodotus
British Empire in India or British Raj
Dominion of India or Union of India (1947 to 1950), the Republic of India before the adoption of its constitution
India (East Syriac Ecclesiastical Province), a historical ecclesiastical province of the Church of the East
Greater India, the historical extent of Indian culture beyond the Indian subcontinent

Music
La India (born 1969), salsa singer from Puerto Rico
Índia, Gal Costa album (1973)
India?, a 1984 album by Suns of Arqa
India (Vega album) (2003)
India (Xandria album) (2005)
"India", a song by John Coltrane from Impressions
"India", a song by Edvin Marton from Virtuoso 
"India", a song by the Psychedelic Furs from The Psychedelic Furs
"India", a song by Puressence from Puressence
"India", a 1982 song by Roxy Music from Avalon
"India", a song by Sadist from Tribe

People
India (given name), a given name and list of people with the name
India (actress) (born 1977), pornographic actress and singer
Jonathan India (born 1996), American baseball player
La India (born 1969), Puerto Rican singer and songwriter

Other uses
India (battle honour), a battle honour awarded to regiments of the British Army between 1787 and 1826
India (cat) (1990–2009), George W. Bush's pet cat
India-class submarine, a military submarine design of the Soviet Union
India: Kingdom of the Tiger, 2002 IMAX documentary based on the writings of Jim Corbett
 45574 India, a British LMS Jubilee Class locomotive
India, a letter in the NATO phonetic alphabet

See also
 India Meridionalis, a phantom peninsula formerly believed to lie east of Malaysia
 India Superior and Alta India ("Upper India"), an area of this peninsula and/or the Americas
 India tag, an item of stationery
 Indian (disambiguation)
 Inđija, a town in Serbia
 Inndia, a 2012 song by Inna
 Three Indias, sometimes including Ethiopia or the Americas